West End was an English association football club from London, with a claimed foundation date of 1868.  It was the works side of the Marshall & Snelgrove department store.  The club's first recorded match was in October 1873.

Its first year of entry to the FA Cup was 1879-80, and the club reached the fourth round (last ten), albeit thanks to one bye and one walkover after the Swifts withdrew from the competition.  The club reached the second round of the Cup in the next two years.  In 1881-82, the club drew 1-1 with Reading, but was disqualified before the replay could take place for an unknown reason.

The club's last FA Cup tie was a 3-3 draw with Upton Park in 1884-85 as it withdrew from the competition before the replay.

Grounds

In 1875, the club was playing at Wormwood Scrubs. By 1877, the club  had moved to Wormholt Farm in Shepherd's Bush,  In 1878-79, the club was playing at the Royal Oak in Harlesden, but by 1879-80 the club was once more playing in Shepherd's Bush, probably on the same pitch, using the Askew Arms for facilities.

Colours

References

Association football clubs established in 1868
Defunct football clubs in England
1868 establishments in England
Association football clubs established in the 19th century